This is a list of commonly seen fish that can be kept in a brackish water aquarium.

Cyprinodontiformes

Catfish

Pufferfish

Gobies

Cichlids

Beloniformes

Other fish

See also 
List of brackish aquarium invertebrate species
List of brackish aquarium plant species
List of fish common names
List of aquarium fish by scientific name
List of freshwater aquarium fish species
List of freshwater aquarium plant species
List of freshwater aquarium amphibian species
List of marine aquarium fish species

References

Lists of fishes
Fishkeeping
Brackish